Pretty Ugly is the fourth studio album by the American punk rock band Lunachicks. It was released by Go-Kart Records in 1997.

Critical reception
Ox-Fanzine called Pretty Ugly "a halfway respectable stupid rock album."

Track listing

References

External links
 Lunachicks on Myspace

1997 albums
Lunachicks albums
Go-Kart Records albums